The 1895–96 Ottawa Hockey Club season was the club's 11th season of play. Ottawa placed second in the league.

Team business 
At the team annual meeting, the following officers were elected:
 Hon. T. M. Daly – Honorary president
 P. D. Ross – Honorary vice-president
 A. Z. Palmer – President
 S. Maynard Rogers – Vice-president
 D'Arcy Scott – Secretary
 G. Patterson Murphy – Treasurer
 C. T. Kirby – Captain
 H. Y. Russel, H. Pulford, W. A. Cox – Executive committee

Source:

Season

Highlights 

After playing both goal and forward in the previous season, Harry Westwick played forward only and he responded with 8 goals. Alf Smith was close behind with 7 goals. Fred Chittick played all eight games for Ottawa.

Ottawa was the only team to defeat the Montreal Victorias, defeating them 3–2 in Montreal before 5000 fans. The Victorias won the return match in Ottawa by the same 3–2 score.

Final standing

Schedule and results

Player statistics

Goaltending averages

Scoring Leaders

Roster 
 Fred Chittick (goal)
 Chauncey Kirby
 Harvey Pulford
 Bert Russel
 Alf Smith
 Harry Westwick
 Fred White
 Weldy Young

Source: Kitchen(2008)

See also 

 1896 AHAC season

References 

 
 

Ottawa Senators (original) seasons
Ottawa